Elijah Monroe Molden (born January 30, 1999) is an American football cornerback for the Tennessee Titans of the National Football League (NFL). He played college football at Washington and was drafted by the Titans in the third round of the 2021 NFL Draft.

High school career
Molden attended West Linn High School in West Linn, Oregon. He played cornerback and running back in high school. In 2014, his sophomore year, West Linn went 8-3 and advanced to the state's 6A quarterfinals. He rushed for 784 yards on 110 carries, with nine rushing touchdowns and had 38 receptions for 542 yards and seven receiving touchdowns.

As a junior in 2015, Molden helped lead West Linn to a 12-2 mark and a berth in the 6A state title game. He rushed for 1,071 yards on 106 carries, with seventeen rushing touchdowns and had 476 receiving yards on 28 receptions with six receiving touchdowns. Molden earned first-team All-Three Rivers League on both offense and defense.
In his senior season, Molden helped lead the West Linn to a 14-0 record, including a 62-7 victory in the 6A state championship game. He rushed for 784 yards on 59 carries, with ten rushing touchdowns. He averaged 11.3 yards per rushing attempt. Receiving, Molden caught 19 passes for 249 and six receiving touchdowns. On defense, he recorded three interceptions.

After his senior season, Molden was a nationally ranked recruit. ESPN listed him as the # 2 ranked prospect in Oregon, # 213 overall and 19th ranked cornerback in the country. Scout.com ranked Molden the No. 151 overall recruit and No. 17 cornerback in the country. 247Sports.com listed him at No. 2 in Oregon, No. 25 in the nation at cornerback and No. 193 overall.

College
Although Molden’s father was a standout at the University of Oregon, Elijah wanted to create his own legacy. He was heavily recruited by several universities, including Oregon, Notre Dame, USC, Stanford and Utah; but he eventually chose to play at the University of Washington under head coach Chris Petersen. He played in all 13 games during his true freshman season. In his sophomore season, Molden played in all 14 games and had two starts, including the Pac-12 title game. He won the school’s award for Most Outstanding Special Teams Player.

Molden started all 13 games again in his junior season. He was named the MVP of the Las Vegas Bowl, after totaling nine tackles, a half tackle for loss, a forced fumble and an interception in the win over Boise State. He was recognized for his outstanding season, including, the CoSIDA Academic All-District 8 team, Pro Football Focus All-America second-team, first-team All-Pac-12, Pro Football Focus and Associated Press All-Pac-12 first-team, Phil Steele's All-Pac-12 first-team and All-America honorable mention, and the Pac-12 Academic Honor Roll.

His senior season was cut short by the COVID-19 pandemic. Molden started every game of the four-game season. Again, he was recognized at the conclusion of the season for his performance both on and off the field. He was named a second-team All-American by Pro Football Focus, which also named him Pac-12 Player of the Year. He earned first-team All-Pac-12 for the second season in a row and he was one of 12 finalists for the William V. Campbell Trophy. He was a semifinalist for the Lott IMPACT Trophy. Finally, he won the 113th annual Guy Flaherty Most Inspirational Award, and also the UW's Defensive MVP, at the team's postseason awards banquet.

On December 21, 2020, Molden announced that he would forgo his remaining eligibility and enter his name in the 2021 NFL Draft.

College statistics

Professional career

On April 30, 2021, the Tennessee Titans selected Molden with the 100th overall pick in the third round of the 2021 NFL Draft. He signed his four-year rookie contract with Tennessee on July 22.

On September 9, 2022, Molden was placed on injured reserve. He was activated from injured reserve on November 12, 2022. He was placed back on injured reserve on December 7.

Personal life
Molden is the son of Alex and Christin Molden. He is the second oldest of eight children. His father is a member of the University of Oregon Hall of Fame and an eight-year NFL cornerback.

References

External links
Tennessee Titans bio
Washington Huskies bio

Living people
People from West Linn, Oregon
Players of American football from Oregon
Sportspeople from the Portland metropolitan area
American football cornerbacks
Washington Huskies football players
1999 births
Tennessee Titans players